Leanne Rycroft (born 9 February 1969) is an Australian gymnast. She competed in five events at the 1988 Summer Olympics.

References

External links
 

1969 births
Living people
Australian female artistic gymnasts
Olympic gymnasts of Australia
Gymnasts at the 1988 Summer Olympics
Place of birth missing (living people)
20th-century Australian women